Douglas County is any of twelve counties in the United States, all of which are named for Stephen A. Douglas, a Senator from Illinois from 1847 to 1861 and the Democratic Party nominee for president in 1860:

Douglas County, Colorado
Douglas County, Georgia
Douglas County, Illinois 
Douglas County, Kansas 
Douglas County, Minnesota 
Douglas County, Missouri 
Douglas County, Nebraska 
Douglas County, Nevada 
Douglas County, Oregon 
Douglas County, South Dakota 
Douglas County, Washington 
Douglas County, Wisconsin